These are lists of renamed places by country, sorted by continent.

Africa 
  — List of renamed places in Angola
  — List of renamed places in Chad
  — Former place names in the Democratic Republic of the Congo
  — List of renamed places in the Republic of the Congo
  — List of renamed places in Eswatini
  — List of renamed places in the Gambia
  — List of renamed places in Madagascar
  — List of renamed places in Malawi
  — List of renamed places in Mozambique
  — List of renamed places in Namibia
  — List of renamed places in South Africa
  — List of renamed places in Zambia
  — List of renamed places in Zimbabwe

Asia 
  — List of renamed cities in Armenia
  — List of cities renamed by Azerbaijan
  — List of renamed places in Bangladesh
 
 List of renamed places in India
 Renaming of cities in India
  — List of renamed cities in Iran
  — List of renamed cities in Kazakhstan
  — List of renamed cities in Kyrgyzstan
  — List of renamed places in Myanmar
  — List of renamed places in Pakistan
 
 List of renamed cities and municipalities in the Philippines
 List of renamed streets in Metro Manila
  — List of renamed cities and towns in Russia
  — List of renamed cities in Tajikistan
 
 Place name changes in Turkey
 List of renamed cities, towns and regions in Turkey
  — List of renamed cities in Turkmenistan
  — List of renamed cities in Uzbekistan

Europe 
  — List of renamed cities in Belarus
  — List of renamed cities in Estonia
  — List of renamed cities in Georgia
 
 Geographical name changes in Greece
 List of former toponyms in Drama Prefecture
 List of former toponyms in Kavala Prefecture
 List of former toponyms in Grevena Prefecture
 List of former toponyms in Pella Prefecture
 List of former toponyms in Pieria Prefecture
 List of former toponyms in Imathia Prefecture
 List of former toponyms in Xanthi Prefecture
 List of former toponyms in Florina Prefecture
  — List of renamed places in Hungary
  — List of renamed places in Italy
  — List of renamed cities in Kazakhstan
  — List of renamed cities in Latvia
  — List of renamed cities in Lithuania
  — List of renamed populated places in Moldova
  — List of renamed places in Romania
  — List of renamed cities and towns in Russia
 
 Geographical name changes in Turkey
 List of renamed cities, towns and regions in Turkey
 
 List of renamed cities in Ukraine
 List of Ukrainian toponyms that were changed as part of decommunization in 2016

North America 
 
 List of renamed places in the United States
 List of former place names in Brevard County, Florida
 Neighborhood rebranding in New York City

Oceania 
  — List of Australian place names changed from German names

Other 
 Geographical renaming
 List of administrative division name changes
 List of city name changes

Geography-related lists